30 karatów szczęścia (30 Carats of Happiness) is a 1936 Polish comedy film directed by Michał Waszyński. The movie is written by Jan Fethke and Napoleon Sądek. Music created Henryk Wars.

Cast
Adolf Dymsza as  Dodek 
Jadwiga Andrzejewska as Zoska 
Janina Brochwiczówna  
Maria Chmurkowska as The Actress 
Ludwik Fritsche as Valet 
Władysław Grabowski as Detective Raczek 
Wanda Jarszewska as Dobrowolska 
Wiktor Kazimierczak as The Magician 
Eugeniusz Koszutski as The Champ 
Józef Orwid as Pikulski 
Irena Skwierczyńska as Marcinowa 
Aleksander Suchcicki as The Magician's Aide 
Janina Wilczówna

External links 
 
30 karatów szczęścia on Filmweb
30 karatów szczęścia on Film Polski

References 

1936 films
1930s Polish-language films
Polish black-and-white films
Films directed by Michał Waszyński
1936 comedy films
Polish comedy films